Hormurus ochyroscapter is a species of scorpion in the Hormuridae family. It is native to Australia, where it occurs in north-eastern Queensland. It was first described in 2013.

Etymology
The specific epithet ochyroscapter comes from the Greek ochyros (‘strong’) and skapter (‘digger’), with reference to the robust pincers of the species.

Description
The holotype specimen is 47 mm in length. Colouration varies over the body from pale yellow to reddish-brown to dark brown to black.

Distribution and habitat
The species has been recorded from the Charters Towers region and the Shire of Etheridge in Far North Queensland in open woodland and savanna.

References

 

 
ochyroscapter
Scorpions of Australia
Endemic fauna of Australia
Fauna of Queensland
Animals described in 2013